Ina or INA may refer to:

Organizations
 National Institute of Arts, Kinshasa (Institut National des Arts), a higher educational institute for performance arts
 Institut national de l'audiovisuel, a repository of all French radio and television audiovisual archives
 Institute of Nautical Archaeology
 Iraqi National Accord, an Iraqi political party
 Iraqi National Alliance, an Iraqi alliance of Shi'a political parties

Businesses
 INA d.d. (Industrija nafte), Croatia's national oil company
 Indian National Airways, a former airline based out of Delhi, India
 Indonesia Investment Authority, a sovereign wealth fund of Indonesia
 Insurance Company of North America, an American insurance company, now part of ACE Limited
 Istituto Nazionale delle Assicurazioni, an Italian insurance company
 INA, a division of the Schaeffler Group

Places
 Ina, Ibaraki, Japan
 Ina, Nagano, Japan
 Ina, Saitama, Japan
 Ina (river), Poland
 Iňa, Slovakia
 Ina, Illinois, United States
 INA Colony, New Delhi, India
 Dilli Haat - INA metro station, serving the aforementioned locality
 Ina (crater), a depression on the Moon

People
 Ina (given name)
 Ina (surname)

Other uses
 Indonesia (by IOC country code)
 Immigration and Nationality Act (disambiguation), U.S. laws
 Indian National Army, an anti-British Indian force during WWII
 Indian Naval Academy
 Iraqi News Agency, during Saddam regime
 intrinsic Noise Analyzer (iNA), a biochemical software package
 Instrumentation amplifier, a type of differential amplifier
 Ina (goddess), in Polynesian mythology
 Ina (film), a 1982 Indian teen romance
 Ina language, an unclassified language of Brazil
 ina, ISO 639 codes for the Interlingua constructed language

See also
 
 Aina (disambiguation)